Yablunytsia is a small village in Nadvirna Raion, Ivano-Frankivsk Oblast in Ukraine. It is a ski resort in the winter time. Yablunytsia belongs to Polianytsia rural hromada, one of the hromadas of Ukraine.

History
During World War II, there was a border pass to Hungary which was guarded by a special German sub-branch of security police settled in Tatariv (Aussenstelle). Many Hungarian Jews were transported to and shot in Yablunytsya.

Until 18 July 2020, Yablunytsia belonged to Yaremche Municipality. The municipality was abolished in July 2020 as part of the administrative reform of Ukraine, which reduced the number of raions of Ivano-Frankivsk Oblast to six. The area of Yaremche Municipality was merged into Nadvirna Raion.

References

External links
Information about the ski resort

Villages in Nadvirna Raion
Vorokhta
Populated places on the Prut
Holocaust locations in Ukraine